International Journal of Cultural Policy is a peer-reviewed academic journal covering interdisciplinary research on the meaning, function and impact of cultural policies. The journal is published by Routledge and the editor-in-chief is Oliver Bennett.

The International Conference on Cultural Policy Research, a biannual research conference, is organised in association with the International Journal of Cultural Policy.

Abstracting and indexing 
The journal is abstracted and indexed in:

References

External links 
 

Taylor & Francis academic journals
English-language journals
Publications established in 1994
Cultural journals
5 times per year journals